Darren Pettet is an Australian former professional rugby league footballer who played in the 1990s. He played for Parramatta in the Australian Rugby League competition.

Early life
Pettet grew up in Coolah, New South Wales before moving to Sydney and signing with Parramatta. He attended Patricians Brothers Fairfield.

Playing career
Pettet made his first grade debut for Parramatta in round 7 1996 against the Auckland Warriors at Mt. Smart Stadium which ended in a 28–4 loss.

In the 1997 ARL season, Parramatta reached the finals for the first time since their premiership success in 1986 as they finished third during the regular season.  Pettet played from the bench in Parramatta's qualifying final loss against the Newcastle Knights.  Parramatta had led the match 20–2 at halftime before losing 28–20.  

The following week, Pettet again played from the bench in the club's 24–14 loss against North Sydney at the Sydney Football Stadium.  Once again, Parramatta had the halftime lead before capitulating in the second half.  This was Pettet's final top grade appearance for Parramatta and he continued to play in the lower grades until he snapped his achilles and was released by the club.

Pettet then moved to Forster and played in the local competition there with the Forster Tuncurry Hawks.

Post playing
In 2016, Pettet was named as the head coach of the Forster Tuncurry Hawks.

References

1975 births
Living people
Australian rugby league players
Place of birth missing (living people)
Parramatta Eels players
Rugby league second-rows
Rugby league locks
Rugby league players from New South Wales